Manuel Peñalver Aniorte (born 10 December 1998 in Torrevieja) is a Spanish cyclist, who currently rides for UCI ProTeam .

Major results
2018
 1st Stage 7 Tour of China I
2020
 9th Trofeo Campos, Porreres, Felanitx, Ses Salines
2021
 6th Grand Prix du Morbihan
 9th Tour de Vendée
2023
 8th Cholet-Pays de la Loire

Grand Tour general classification results timeline

References

External links

1998 births
Living people
Spanish male cyclists
People from Vega Baja del Segura
Sportspeople from the Province of Alicante
Competitors at the 2018 Mediterranean Games
Mediterranean Games competitors for Spain
Cyclists from the Valencian Community